Cafaggio is a village in Tuscany, central Italy, administratively a frazione of the comune of Campiglia Marittima, province of Livorno. At the time of the 2011 census its population was 407.

Cafaggio is about 70 km from Livorno and 3 km from Campiglia Marittima.

References

Bibliography 
 

Frazioni of the Province of Livorno